Blue Murder is an occasional English folk supergroup, consisting at various times of various members of Swan Arcade, Coope Boyes and Simpson, Waterson–Carthy and The Watersons. 

Dave and Heather Brady and Jim Boyes of Swan Arcade and The Watersons' Norma and Lal Waterson gathered at Whitby Folk Week in August 1986 for a charity concert for the benefit of the local school. The ensemble, probably performing as The Boggle Hole Chorale, performed at the Festival's final ceilidh.

In 1987, Ian Anderson invited The Watersons and Swan Arcade to appear at Bracknell Festival, separately and together. The collective group was named "Blue Murder" by Martin Carthy.  The line up for the festival was: Martin Carthy, with Norma, Lal, Rachel and Mike Waterson, plus Heather Brady, Dave Brady and Jim Boyes.

This version of Blue Murder performed in 1987 and 1988 at Wath upon Dearne in South Yorkshire, at The Queen Elizabeth Hall in London, at a variety of British festivals, and at the Brossella Festival in Brussels.  A demo was put together from their Wath concert performance and a track from a concert in Bracknell appears on The Carthy Chronicles (Free Reed FRQCD-60), but this incarnation of the band made no studio recordings.

In 1994, Blue Murder performed "I Bid You Goodnight" for a benefit album Out on the Rolling Sea. By this time, Swan Arcade had split up, and Heather Brady was unavailable on the day of recording. Barry Coope and Lester Simpson of Coope Boyes and Simpson replaced the two Bradys. Eliza Carthy meanwhile had replaced Rachel Waterson in the Watersons.

The third incarnation of the group began in 2000, following the death of Lal Waterson, when they appeared for a "Yorkshire Evening." They appeared at the Sidmouth Festival in 2001. A concert tour followed in 2002, along with the recording of their first (and thus far only) studio album, No One Stands Alone. The line-up for 2000–2002 was Norma and Mike Waterson, Martin and Eliza Carthy, Barry Coope, Jim Boyes and Lester Simpson.

This line up – occasionally minus Eliza Carthy when Blue Murder performances clashed with her other commitments – performed sporadically over the next few years, largely on the UK festival circuit. Eventually, Eliza was permanently replaced by Maria Gilhooley, Lal Waterson's daughter and occasional Watersons and Waterson–Carthy collaborator. On 23 November 2007 this line up made its debut concert appearance at the Met Theatre in Bury, Greater Manchester.

Discography
 The Carthy Chronicles  (Free Reed Records. Cat. No: FRQCD 60) 2001
 4-CD box set tracing the career of Martin Carthy includes one track by the original Blue Murder line-up, recorded live at Bracknell Festival 11 July 1987. 
 ANC Song (Azicatal), Blue Murder (mk I): Heather Brady, Lal Waterson, Rachel Waterson, Norma Waterson, Martin Carthy, Mike Waterson, Dave Brady and Jim Boyes: vocals
 Out on the Rolling Sea: A tribute to the music of Joseph Spence & the Pinder Family  (Hokey Pokey Records. Cat. No: HPR 2004.2) 1994
 Various artists compilation album, including one track by Blue Murder. 
 "I Bid You Goodnight," Blue Murder (mk II):: Eliza Carthy: lead vocals; Lal Waterson, Norma Waterson, Jim Boyes, Martin Carthy, Barry Coope, Lester Simpson and Mike Waterson: vocals 
 Shining Bright: The Songs of Lal & Mike Waterson  (Topic Records. Cat. No: TSCD519) 2002
 Various artists compilation including one track by Blue Murder (Martin Carthy, Eliza Carthy, Norma Waterson, Jim Boyes and Barry Coope appear elsewhere on other tracks on this album). 
 "Bright Phoebus," Blue Murder (mk III): Lester Simpson, Barry Coope, Jim Boyes, Martin Carthy, Eliza Carthy, Norma Waterson, Mike Waterson: vocals; Martin Carthy: guitar, Lester Simpson: accordion
 No One Stands Alone  (Topic Records. Cat. No: TSCD537) 2002
 Three Score and Ten, Topic Records 70-year anniversary boxed set included the title track from No One stands Alone as track twenty two on the seventh CD 2009

External links
 Coope Boyes and Simpson's page on Blue Murder
 Unofficial Blue Murder MySpace page
 Official Waterson–Carthy website
 Swan Arcade MySpace page

English folk musical groups